Leprecon can refer to:

 A misspelling of Leprechaun, a creature in Irish mythology
 LepreCon, science fiction convention held annually in Phoenix, Arizona, United States
 LEPrecon, Lower Elements Police reconnaissance squad in the fictional Artemis Fowl series
 Leprecon, an annual gaming convention held in Trinity College Dublin each spring
 LepreCon, similar to SantaCon, is a social event where people dress as Leprechauns and pub crawl.